Obdam is a railway station in Obdam, Netherlands. The station opened in 1898, on the Hoorn - Heerhugowaard line. There are two tracks at this station, creating a passing loop on the otherwise single-track railway.

Train services
The following services currently call at Obdam:
2x per hour local service (sprinter) Hoorn - Alkmaar - Uitgeest - Haarlem - Amsterdam

Bus services

External links
NS website 
Dutch public transport travel planner 

Railway stations in North Holland
Railway stations opened in 1898